Ronald Cope (5 October 1934 – 27 August 2016)  was an English  footballer from Crewe, Cheshire, who played as a centre half-back in the Football League for Manchester United and Luton Town.

Cope played four times for England Schoolboys in 1950. He joined Manchester United as an amateur in the same year, turned professional in 1951, and made his debut for the club on 29 September 1956 against Arsenal at Highbury. However, he only gained a regular first-team place after the Munich air disaster. He lost his first-team place to Bill Foulkes in October 1960, and left United for Luton Town in August 1961 on a £10,000 transfer. He left the professional scene two years later, although he continued to play at non-league level for Northwich Victoria and also served the Cheshire club as manager.  

His father, George, had played for Crewe Alexandra, and he was considered a stand-out player in the squad, always being where he was needed. Like his father, Cope also played Cheshire County League football for Nantwich.

Cope died on 27 August 2016.

References

External links
 

1934 births
2016 deaths
Sportspeople from Crewe
English footballers
Association football defenders
Manchester United F.C. players
Luton Town F.C. players
Northwich Victoria F.C. players
Northwich Victoria F.C. managers
English Football League players
English football managers
FA Cup Final players

Nantwich Town F.C. players